The Samaya  is a daily newspaper which was first published in 1996 in Bhubaneswar. Its editor was S. Hota and its publisher Ranjib Biswal.

References

Odia-language newspapers
Daily newspapers published in India
1996 establishments in Orissa
Publications established in 1996
Mass media in Bhubaneswar